The Metropolitan Area of Strait of Messina (Area Metropolitana dello Stretto di Messina, in Italian), is the urban agglomeration around the Strait of Messina, and is one of the most populated and important areas of Southern Italy. It includes part of the Province of Messina, in Sicily, and part of the Province of Reggio Calabria, in Calabria.

Geography

Population

Major cities
Messina, is a city situated in the extreme north-eastern tip of Sicily, also called "gate of Sicily", in ancient times was called "Zancle" and "Messana". Ancient city, has reached the pinnacle of his greatness, in the Late Middle Ages and in the mid-seventeenth century, when contending with Palermo, the Sicilian capital role. In 1678, after a historic anti-Spanish revolt, which resulted in the annihilation of its ruling class, a first devastating earthquake has partially destroyed the city in 1783, while in 1908 a devastating earthquake, followed by a tsunami, has razed to the ground the city, and have been generated about 80,000 victims. Rebuilt since 1912, the modern city presents a neat and regular mesh with wide straight streets. In recent years, there are ongoing projects aimed at regeneration of the city through works such as the waterfront, a new headquarters for the railway station, the bridge over the Strait. Messina is a city with an economy based on services, trade, tourism and a significant industrial activity in the shipbuilding craft. Its port is the first in Italy for the number of transit passengers and sixth for cruise traffic.

Reggio Calabria is the first municipality in the Calabria region for residents. Major functional pole in its region, has strong historical, cultural and economic ties with the city of Messina. First city in the region for its age, despite its ancient foundation - Ρηγιον was an important and flourishing colony of Magna Graecia - shows a modern urban system, because of the catastrophic earthquake that December 28, 1908, who destroyed most of the settlement. Its urban system, represents a major economic centers and regional service and transport, in the southern shores of the Mediterranean.
Reggio Calabria, with Naples and Taranto, is home to one of the most important archaeological museums dedicated to Ancient Greece (which houses the famous Bronzes of Riace, rare example of Greek bronze sculpture, which became one of the symbols of the city), of two young universities and the Regional Council of Calabria. The center, consisting primarily of Liberty buildings, has a linear development along the coast, and with parallel streets with the promenade dotted with rares magnolias and exotic palms.

Barcellona Pozzo di Gotto, populous tofnthe  close to Milazzo, it is characterized by an intense activity in: agriculture, trade and industry.

Milazzo is a peninsula, situated the Tyrrhenian Sea, in a strategic place. Located 43 km from Messina, is the benchmark for other little cities: job, trade, services. Originally a Greek city, and from 36 BC recognized as a Roman civitas, Milazzo is now a tourist destination and a great starting point for the Aeolian Islands, the Nebrodi Park, Tindari. There are numerous examples, symbols of the ancient history of the city. Plans are in progress aimed to enter the Castle, the fortified town and the ancient village in the UNESCO sites and to form the Marine Reserve of Capo Milazzo.

Economy

Infrastructure and transport

Highways
The Metropolitan Area of Strait of Messina is connected to the Autostrada A2 (Salerno-Reggio Calabria), A18 (Messina-Catania) and A20 (Messina-Palermo).

Airport
The Strait of Messina Metropolitan Area is served by air links with the Reggio Calabria Airport (IATA: REG, ICAO: LICR). Also known as Aeroporto dello Stretto or Tito Minniti Airport, is located at south of Reggio Calabria. The first track of the airport was built in 1939 with military purposes. On 11 July 1943 a USA air raid razed the structure, and later was rebuilt for civil aviation. The first flight took place on April 10, 1947, with a twin-engine propeller-driven "Douglas DC-3" on the Turin - Bologna - Florence - Naples - Reggio Calabria - Palermo.
The design of the first paved runway began in October 1960. By decision of the Ministry of Defense-Air Force, on 10 December 1975 the airport was named Tito Minniti, first pilot crashed in East Africa December 26, 1935 during the Ethiopian war. It is a structure in increasing improvement; the recent phase of modernization has allowed the increase in the number of available flights to Rome, Milan, Venice, Turin, Pisa, Bologna and other cities in Europe.

History

Culture

Education
The University of Messina (Università degli Studi di Messina, in Italian, or UNIME), is an ancient university, and was founded in 1548 by Ignatio of Loyola such as the first ever College of Jesus's Company. Is formed by ten faculties (Arts and Humanities; Economics; Education; Engineering; Law; Mathematics, Physics and Natural Sciences; Medicine; Pharmacy; Political Science; Veterinary Medicine), distributed in various part of the city of Messina.

The University of Reggio Calabria, or Mediterranean University of Reggio Calabria (Università Mediterranea di Reggio Calabria, in Italian, or UNIRC), was founded in 1968, and is one of the youngest universities in Italy. UNIRC combines its commitment in research and teaching: three faculties (Architecture, Engineering, Agricultural Science), are dedicated to the territory, creating an "Environment Polytechnic" with a strong propensity to the themes of architecture, landscape, urbanism, infrastructure associated at the green economy. The faculty of Law, study from the economic issues to those related to archeology and artistic heritage.

In addition, there are: "Dante Alighieri University" (for foreign student) situated in Reggio Calabria; and two "Academies of Fine Arts" (Decoration, Graphics, Painting, Sculpture and Scenography), situated in Messina and Reggio Calabria.

References

Metropolitan areas of Italy
Messina
Reggio Calabria